Marcel Papama (born 28 April 1996) is a Namibian football player. He plays for African Stars.

International
He made his Namibia national football team debut on 19 April 2018 in a friendly against Eswatini.

He was selected for the 2019 Africa Cup of Nations squad.

References

External links
 
 

1996 births
People from Omusati Region
Living people
Namibian men's footballers
Namibia international footballers
Association football midfielders
African Stars F.C. players
Namibia Premier League players
2019 Africa Cup of Nations players
Namibia A' international footballers
2020 African Nations Championship players